Hemavathi is a 1977 Indian Kannada-language film, directed by Siddalingaiah and produced by N. Veeraswamy, S. P. Varadaraj, J. Chandulal Jain and Siddalingaiah. The film stars G. V. Iyer, Udaykumar, C. H. Lokanath and Yoganarasimha.

Cast

G. V. Iyer
Udaykumar
Lokanath
Gode Lakshminarayan
Ashwini
Shyamala
Shashikala
Sathyabhama

Soundtrack
The music was composed by L. Vaidhyanadhan.

References

External links
 
 

1970s Kannada-language films
Films directed by Siddalingaiah